DeMeco Ryans (born July 28, 1984) is an American football coach and former linebacker who is the head coach for the Houston Texans of the National Football League (NFL). Ryans played college football at the University of Alabama, where he was named a unanimous All-American.

Ryans was selected by the Houston Texans in the second round of the 2006 NFL Draft, where he was recognized as the Defensive Rookie of the Year. Ryans was selected to two Pro Bowls before being traded to the Philadelphia Eagles in 2012, where he spent four seasons before retiring. Ryans joined the 49ers as a coaching assistant in 2017 and coached the inside linebackers from 2018–20 before being named their defensive coordinator in 2021. Ryans was hired as the head coach for the Texans in 2023.

Early years
Ryans was born in Bessemer, Alabama. He attended Jess Lanier High School in Bessemer, where he played high school football. In his senior season, Ryans had 135 tackles, 11 sacks, two forced fumbles, and two interceptions. Considered a three-star recruit by Rivals.com, he was listed as the No. 39 inside linebacker prospect in the nation from the class of 2002. He picked Alabama over Mississippi State.

Playing career

College
Ryans attended the University of Alabama, where he played outside linebacker for coach Mike Shula's Alabama Crimson Tide football team from 2002 to 2005. Ryans started his career by earning a role on special teams and backup linebacker in his first season. By making great improvements every year in his college career, Ryans went on to become the SEC's Defensive Player of the Year for his performance in 2005. Later on, he attributed much of his college success to his defensive coordinator at Alabama, Joe Kines. He was named the 2006 Cotton Bowl Classic defensive MVP in their 13–10 win over Texas Tech. Following his senior season, Ryans received the Lott Trophy for his combination of athletic excellence and off-the-field achievements and was recognized as a unanimous first-team All-American.

Awards and honors
2006 NCAA Top Eight Award (Class of 2006)
2006 Cotton Bowl Classic – Defensive MVP
2005 Consensus first-team All-America
2005 SEC – Defensive Player of the Year
2005 First-team All-SEC
2005 Lott Trophy
2005 Bednarik Trophy Semifinalist
2005 Butkus Award Finalist
2005 Draddy Award Finalist
2005 Nagurski Award Finalist
2005 Lombardi Award Semifinalist
2004 Second-team All-SEC

National Football League

Houston Texans 
Ryans was selected with the first pick of the second round (33rd overall) in the 2006 NFL Draft by the Texans. He was the highest-selected Alabama linebacker since Dwayne Rudd was drafted 20th overall by the Minnesota Vikings in 1997. Though Ryans had been an outside linebacker in college, he earned the starting middle linebacker position due to his excellent performance in the preseason. In his first game, Ryans recorded a league-high 12 solo tackles against the Philadelphia Eagles. He had an overwhelming impact as a rookie linebacker for the Texans, leading the team in tackles in the first half of the 2006 season. He was named AFC Defensive Player of the Week for his Week 13 game against the Oakland Raiders.

Ryans was named the AP NFL Defensive Rookie of the Year after finishing second in the league with 155 total tackles (Zach Thomas 165), 31 more tackles than the next rookie (Detroit Lions linebacker Ernie Sims). He was named to the NFL All-Rookie Team. In 2007, Ryans was named a first-team All-Pro linebacker and was selected to the Pro Bowl twice in 2007 and 2009.

On March 30, 2010, Ryans signed a six-year extension worth $48 million, including $21.75 million guaranteed.

Philadelphia Eagles
On March 20, 2012, Ryans was traded to the Philadelphia Eagles in exchange for a 2012 fourth-round draft pick (used on Ben Jones) and a swap of third-round picks between the two teams (used on Brandon Brooks and Nick Foles) Ryans was immediately inserted as the team's starting Middle Linebacker. Although the Eagles were 4-12, Ryans still made plays, leading the team in tackles with 113 while adding a sack and interception.

In 2013, Ryans improved even further, leading the team in tackles once more with 127, while also recording career highs in sacks (4.0), interceptions (2), and interception return yardage (46). On January 4, 2014, he had 10 tackles and his first career playoff interception in his first playoff game with the Eagles, a close 26–24 loss to the New Orleans Saints. On November 3, 2014, Ryans was placed on injured reserve after tearing his Achilles tendon.

Ryans was released on February 24, 2016.

NFL career statistics

Regular season

Postseason

Coaching career

San Francisco 49ers
On February 28, 2017, Ryans was hired by the San Francisco 49ers as a defensive quality control coach. In 2018, he was promoted to inside linebackers coach. On January 18, 2021, Ryans was promoted to defensive coordinator following the departure of Robert Saleh, who left to become the head coach of the New York Jets.

Following a successful postseason for the 49ers defense, Ryans was interviewed for the head coaching vacancy at the Minnesota Vikings, but declined a second interview and opted to remain with the 49ers.

In 2022, Ryans' unit finished as the top defense in football by DVOA, second by weighted DVOA, fifth against the pass, and second against the rush. He was named as the PFWA Assistant Coach of the Year.

Houston Texans 
On January 31, 2023, Ryans was announced as the next head coach of the Houston Texans after signing a six-year contract. He is the third head coach hired in the last three offseasons by the Texans.

Head coaching record

Personal life
Ryans and his wife have three children.

References

External links
 Houston Texans bio
 Alabama Crimson Tide bio

1984 births
Living people
All-American college football players
American Conference Pro Bowl players
American football middle linebackers
Alabama Crimson Tide football players
Houston Texans players
National Football League Defensive Rookie of the Year Award winners
Sportspeople from Bessemer, Alabama
Philadelphia Eagles players
Players of American football from Alabama
American members of the Churches of Christ
San Francisco 49ers coaches
Houston Texans head coaches
Bessemer City High School (Alabama) alumni
National Football League defensive coordinators
African-American coaches of American football
African-American players of American football
21st-century African-American sportspeople
20th-century African-American people
Ed Block Courage Award recipients